Panaeolus cambodginiensis is a potent hallucinogenic mushroom that contains psilocybin and psilocin. It was described in 1979 as Copelandia cambodginiensis.

Description
The cap is less than 23 mm across, with a convex shape and an incurved margin when young, expanding to broadly convex. The cap surface is smooth, often cracking with irregular fissures. The gills are gray to black. The spores are black, shaped like lemons, smooth, measuring 11 x 8 μm. The entire mushroom quickly bruises blue where it is handled.

It can be differentiated from the similar Panaeolus cyanescens by microscopic characteristics.

Distribution and habitat
Panaeolus cambodginiensis is mushroom that grows on dung of water buffalo. It was first described from Cambodia and is widespread throughout the Asian subtropics and Hawaii.

Alkaloid content
Strongly bluing species. Merlin and Allen (1993) reported the presence of psilocybin and psilocin, up to .55% and .6%, respectively.

See also

List of Panaeolus species

References

External links
 Mushroom John - Panaeolus cambodginiensis
 Erowid - Panaeolus cambodginiensis
 A Worldwide Geographical Distribution of the Neurotropic Fungi

cambodginiensis
Psychoactive fungi
Psychedelic tryptamine carriers
Fungi of Asia
Fungi of Oceania
Fungi of Hawaii
Fungi without expected TNC conservation status